Ola Bjørnstad (born 12 November 1940) is a Norwegian forester and civil servant.

He graduated in forestry from the Norwegian College of Agriculture in 1966. He has spent his career working with forestry and transport. He has worked as a researcher for the Institute of Transport Economics, transport consulent in Landbrukets Sentralforbund, secretary for the Standing Committee on Transport and Communications, transport director in Norske Skog and sub-director in the Norwegian Ministry of Transport and Communications. From 1982 to 1990 he was the director of the Directorate of State Forests, and from 1993 to 2006 he was the director of the Opplysningsrådet for Veitrafikken.

He resides in Vinterbro.

References

1940 births
Living people
Norwegian foresters
Norwegian College of Agriculture alumni
Directors of government agencies of Norway